Zelfagar "Zelfy" Nazary (born 1 January 1995) is an Afghan professional footballer who plays for St Albans Saints in the National Premier Leagues Victoria and the Afghan national team.

Early life 

Nazary moved to Australia with his family where he lived in Katanning, Western Australia and played for clubs in Albany, Western Australia.

Club career 

Nazary played in the National Premier Leagues Western Australia over four seasons with Balcatta FC and Floreat Athena.

In 2018 Nazary moved to Queensland where he helped Olympic FC reach the National Premier Leagues Queensland Grand Final and FFA Cup round of 32. 

Nazary joined league rivals Western Pride in June 2019.

International career 
Nazary made his international debut for Afghanistan against Palestine national football team in August 2018. He won his second cap against Tajikistan, coming on as a substitute in a 1–1 draw in June 2019.

International goals 
Scores and results list Afghanistan's goal tally first.

References

External links
 NFT Profile
 Soccerway Profile

1995 births
Living people
Afghan footballers
Afghanistan international footballers
Afghan emigrants to Australia
Association football midfielders
National Premier Leagues players
Floreat Athena FC players
Dandenong Thunder SC players
Soccer players from Western Australia